Andrew Boff (born 14 April 1958) is a British politician who has been Deputy Chair of the London Assembly since May 2022. A member of the Conservative Party, he has served a London-wide Assembly Member (AM) since the 2008 election. Boff served as Leader of the Conservatives in the London Assembly from June 2012 to October 2015.

Andrew Boff was a supporter of the "Yes! To fairer votes" campaign in the 2011 UK Alternative Vote referendum. He was the Conservative representative at a "Yes!" event in London on 3 May 2011.

Political career

Early career 
Active in politics since the 1970s, Boff was a Young Conservative branch founder whilst still at school; in 1976 he proposed the legalisation of cannabis at a Young Conservative national conference. His mother Elsie was already a councillor when he was elected a councillor in Hillingdon in 1982. He later served as Leader of the Council between 1990 and 1992. In 1992, he stepped down to run for Parliament, defending the marginal Hornsey and Wood Green constituency. He lost the seat to Labour's Barbara Roche with 39.2% of the vote.

Boff ran in the safe Labour seat of London South Inner in the 1994 election to the European Parliament. He was placed seventh on the Conservative list in London in the 1999 European Parliament election. He failed to be elected both times.

London Assembly 
Boff became known in London politics after he contested the Conservative nomination for the London mayoral elections in 2000, 2004 and 2008. He came second in 2000 behind Steven Norris. He came second again in 2008. In summer 2018, Boff launched another campaign to be the Conservative candidate for Mayor of London in 2021. He was shortlisted along with Joy Morrissey and fellow London Assembly Member Shaun Bailey. Boff finished once again in second place with 35% of the vote, an increase of 31% on his run for the nomination in 2015 for the 2016 election.

Boff was placed first on the Conservative top-up list for the London Assembly in 2008, comfortably winning a seat. He was re-elected in 2012, 2016 and 2021. He ran for the chairmanship of the assembly in 2010, with the backing of the eleven Conservative members, but lost to Liberal Democrat Dee Doocey, who received the backing of the fourteen other members, including Richard Barnbrook. After his first re-election to the London Assembly, Boff was elected as the GLA Conservative Group Leader. He was succeeded by Gareth Bacon in October 2015.

In September 2015, Boff called for a managed street prostitution zone to be set up in East London in order to protect sex workers from harm.

In 2019, Boff became Chairman of the Confirmation Hearings Committee and the Planning Committee. In May 2021, he was elected Chairman of the London Assembly. In May 2022, he became Deputy Chairman of the London Assembly.

Hackney politics 
He has stood for office numerous times in Hackney, where he lived. He received the Conservative nomination for the elections in 2002 and 2006 to elect the Mayor of Hackney, but came second both times. He was the Conservatives' London Assembly candidate for the North East constituency in 2004, but came third, behind the candidates from both Labour and the Liberal Democrats.

He achieved success in Hackney in 2005, when he won the supposedly safe Labour seat of Queensbridge in a council by-election, before losing it at the 2006 Hackney Council election, albeit with a vote tripled from the previous borough election.

Boff stood for Mayor of Hackney for a third time in 2010. A booklet containing election statements from every candidate except him was distributed to every voter in the borough. It excluded Boff owing to the council's confusion over whether the statements he made about the cost of the mayoralty were legally admissible. By the time they decided that they were, it was too late to print, and the council compounded the problem by telling voters who enquired that Boff was not running. In the contest, Boff fell to third place, behind the Labour incumbent and the Liberal Democrats.

Personal life 
He is an information technology consultant.

Boff is openly gay. In 2005, he was the first person in the United Kingdom to enter a same-sex civil partnership.

Boff is a libertarian, and an outspoken proponent of direct democracy, having prominently publicised the issue at London mayoral hustings and on ConservativeHome.

An atheist and a humanist, Boff is a member of Humanists UK. He helped to launch the Conservative Humanist Association, a Conservative Party ginger group, at an event in London in 2008.

He was involved with the successful reinvigoration of Hackney's Broadway Market in the early 2000s. He also produced a free monthly local magazine for the E8 postcode area.

On 10 June 2019, Boff says he ran into a burning tower block in Barking Riverside to help people escape a fire that had broken out.

References

External links
 Andrew Boff at the London Assembly

1958 births
21st-century English politicians
Conservative Members of the London Assembly
Conservative Party (UK) parliamentary candidates
Councillors in the London Borough of Hackney
Councillors in the London Borough of Hillingdon
English atheists
English humanists
English libertarians
Gay politicians
English LGBT politicians
Living people
People from the London Borough of Hillingdon
21st-century LGBT people